"F for You" is a song by British electronic music duo Disclosure. The track is the fourth single from the duo's debut studio album, Settle. It is the first single from the album not to feature a guest vocalist, and features vocals from Howard instead. The song is used in the EA Sports game, FIFA 14.

Chart performance

Weekly charts

Year-end charts

Remix featuring Mary J. Blige

The song was re-released in the form of a remix, it features the vocals from American singer Mary J. Blige. The remix, while retaining most of the original track from Settle, was recorded by Blige for release as a single. The single was released on 1 January 2014. The remix was nominated for Best Dance Recording at the 57th Annual Grammy Awards.

Track listing

Charts

Year-end charts

Release history

References

2013 singles
2013 songs
Disclosure (band) songs
Mary J. Blige songs
Songs written by Guy Lawrence
Songs written by Howard Lawrence
Island Records singles